The Sixty Sails Handicap is an American Thoroughbred horse race held annually during the third week of April at Hawthorne Race Course in Stickney/Cicero, Illinois. A Grade III event open to Fillies and Mares, age three and older, it is contested on dirt at a distance of one mile and one eighth (9 furlongs).

Inaugurated in 1976 at Sportsman's Park, in 2004, the race was moved to Hawthorne Race Course. It was named for the racing filly Sixty Sails, owned by John Petre and Chris Vodanovich of New Orleans.

Since inception, the Sixty Sails Handicap has been contested at various distances:
 1976–1981 : 1 mile (8 furlongs)
 1982–1984 :  miles (8.5 furlongs)
 1985–present :  miles (9 furlongs)

Race notes
In 1992, Illinois-breds accomplished a historic first when they finished 1-2-3 in the race.

Records
Speed record: 
 1:46.69 – Crafty Oak (1999) (also equalled the track record)

Winners since 1982

Earlier winners
In 1980 and 1981 the Sixty Sails Handicap was run in two divisions.
1981 – Karla's Enough
1981 – Gold Treasure
1980 – Doing It My Way
1980 – Conga Miss
1979 – Strate Sunshine
1978 – Drop the Pigeon
1977 – Kissapotamus
1976 – Enchanted Native

Notes

References
 The 2009 Sixty sails Handicap at the Bloodhorse.com

Graded stakes races in the United States
Horse races in Illinois
Mile category horse races for fillies and mares
Recurring sporting events established in 1976
Hawthorne Race Course
1976 establishments in Illinois